Michael Krüger may refer to:
 Michael Krüger (footballer) (born 1954), German football manager and former player
 Michael Krüger (writer) (born 1943), German writer, publisher, and translator
 Michael Krüger (politician) (born 1955), Austrian lawyer and former Minister of Justice